San Sebastián is a town and municipality in the Cauca Department, Colombia.

The town was founded in 1562.

References

Municipalities of Cauca Department
Populated places established in 1562